Kauan Rodrigues da Silva (born 16 April 2005) is a Brazilian footballer who plays as a midfielder for Goiás.

Club career
Born in Caxias, Maranhão, Kauan moved to Pará as a child. He moved to Goiânia following a trial with Goiás, joining the club in 2017. Following impressive performances for Goiás' youth team, he made his debut in the 2022 season, playing the entirety of a 2–2 penalty Copa Verde loss to Real Noroeste.

He was promoted to the first team for the 2023 season, where his career got off to a good start, scoring on his third appearance in the Campeonato Goiano, the first goal in a 2–0 win over Goianésia on 8 February 2023. He scored his second goal, and notched two assists, in an 8–3 win over Goiânia in the Campeonato Goiano quarter-finals.

Career statistics

Club

Notes

References

2005 births
Living people
Sportspeople from Maranhão
Brazilian footballers
Association football midfielders
Goiás Esporte Clube players